The Southern California Sun were an American football team based in Anaheim, California that played in the World Football League in 1974 and 1975. Their records were 13-7 in 1974 and 7-5 in 1975. Their home stadium was Anaheim Stadium. They were coached by former Rams great and Hall of Famer Tom Fears and owned by trucking magnate Larry Hatfield.  

Former USC greats Anthony Davis and Pat Haden played for the Sun in 1975 along with former Oakland Raiders QB Daryle Lamonica, also known as the "Mad Bomber."

The Sun won the 1974 Western Division title, but lost their playoff game against The Hawaiians when three of their best players--Kermit Johnson, James McAlister and Booker Brown—sat out the game.  The three players were owed back pay, and claimed the missed checks breached their contracts.  This episode aside, the Sun were one of the WFL's better-run teams, and at least had the potential to be a viable venture had the WFL been run in a more realistic and financially sensible manner. A year later, they were leading the West when the league folded on October 22, 1975 in midseason.

Schedule and results

1974 regular season

Playoffs

1975 regular season

See also
 1974 World Football League season
 1975 World Football League season

References

External links
 Southern California Sun on FunWhileItLasted.net
 Southern California Sun Helmets

 
Defunct American football teams in California
American football teams established in 1974
American football teams disestablished in 1975
1974 establishments in California
1975 disestablishments in California